Timothy Taylor (born 1960) is a British-based archaeologist specialising in prehistory and archaeological theory.

Work
Taylor was born in Norfolk and educated at the universities of Cambridge and Oxford.

His academic work began studying ornamental metalwork of the Balkans and western Asia. Since, his focus has shifted and he has done extensive work on the archaeology of cannibalism, sexuality and material culture theory. He has also written several popular books  on archaeology. In the 1980s and 1990s he frequently presented his work on television. The British Archaeological Award winner for "best popular archaeology on television" 1991 was a "Down to Earth" episode on which he appeared. Taylor is known for his closely reasoned, wide-ranging, and provocative ideas, and for his ability to connect with a general audience of readers and viewers.

Taylor is currently Jan Eisner Professor of Archaeology, Comenius University in Bratislava. Until 2020 he was Professor of the Prehistory of Humanity at the University of Vienna (Austria) and is editor-in-chief of the Journal of World Prehistory. Until 2012, he was a senior lecturer in archaeology at the University of Bradford (UK).

Books 

 The Prehistory of Sex: Four Million Years of Human Sexual Culture 1996, Bantam Books  – a controversial book actually beginning eight million years in the past.
 The Buried Soul: How Humans Invented Death 2004, Beacon  – claims evidence for widespread prehistoric vampirism and cannibalism, and that ceremonial burial predates social conceptions of an immortal soul.
 The Artificial Ape: How Technology Changed the Course of Human Evolution 2010, Palgrave Macmillan

Notes

References

External links
 Timothy Taylor on Edge
 A page on Timothy's newer book at the Bradford University site
 

British archaeologists
Academics of the University of Bradford
Living people
1960 births